Fikile April Mbalula (born 1 April 1971 in the Free State) is a South African politician who is the 17th Secretary-General of the African National Congress (ANC). A long-serving cabinet minister, he previously served as Minister of Sports and Recreation from 2010 to 2017, as Minister of Police from 2017 to 2018 and as Minister of Transport between 2019 and 2023. Mbalula is a former leader of the African National Congress Youth League. Mbalula also serves as the head of elections for the African National Congress.

Mbalula was elected Secretary-General of the ANC at the 55th National Conference of the African National Congress in December 2022.

Career
Mbalula was appointed Deputy Minister of Police in the cabinet of Jacob Zuma in May 2009 and later became the Minister of Sport and Recreation after President Zuma changed his cabinet. On 31 March 2017, following a controversial reshuffling in the cabinet, Mbalula was appointed as Minister of Police taking over from Nathi Nhleko after lobbying from the ANC Youth League and possibly as a reward for loyalty towards Zuma, according to media speculation.

In the 2009 general elections he was the manager of the ANC election campaign, which was considered highly successful.

Mbalula was elected to the ANC NEC at the party's Polokwane conference in December 2007 in 15th place, measured by the number of votes. He subsequently retired as president of the ANC Youth League of which, at age 36, he was no longer eligible to be a member.

Mbalula was elected president of the ANC Youth League in August 2004, having previously held the post of secretary general.

Mbalula has been credited with installing South African President Thabo Mbeki in that position, and for later deposing him as head of the ANC. His support has also been described as key in gaining Zuma the ANC presidency in a hard-fought race with Mbeki.

He also supported the candidacy of Julius Malema to succeed him as head of the Youth League in what was seen as a move to ensure continuing League support for Zuma.

In May 2019, President Cyril Ramaphosa appointed Mbalula to the post of Minister of Transport, succeeding Blade Nzimande.

Mbalula was elected as Secretary-General of the ANC at the party's 55th National Conference in December 2022; he replaced Ace Magashule, who was suspended in May 2021. His position as Secretary-General required that Mbalula be at Luthuli House full-time which meant that he would have to resign from government and parliament. In a cabinet reshuffle on 6 March 2023, Deputy Minister of Transport Sindisiwe Chikunga was appointed to succeed Mbalula as Transport Minister. Mbalula resigned from parliament on the same day.

References

1971 births
Living people
People from the Free State (province)
Xhosa people
African National Congress politicians
South African Ministers for Sport and Recreation
Members of the National Assembly of South Africa